The United Shore Professional Baseball League (USPBL) is an independent baseball league in suburban Metro Detroit, Michigan, United States, started in May 2016. Each team in the USPBL plays a 42-game regular season schedule from May through September, with a mid-season all-star game and a championship game at the conclusion of the regular season. The games are played at Jimmy John's Field in Utica. Most of the games are broadcast live on the USPBL's YouTube channel, with select games airing on ESPN3.

History
The United Shore Professional Baseball League was founded by Andy Appleby, a former senior vice president of the Detroit Pistons and Palace Sports and Entertainment. Justin Orenduff, a former First Round Pick of the Los Angeles Dodgers, is the Director of Baseball Operations.

The league has four teams based in Metro Detroit, with all games being played at Jimmy John's Field in Utica, Michigan. The $12 million ballpark has seating for 2,000 and a total capacity of 4,000. It was built on capped brownfield that previously served as an unlicensed dump for household waste. 

The league is aimed at 18- to 25-year-olds who either went undrafted out of college, or who have been released from prior minor league contracts. Their pay is expected to range from $600–$800 per month, with housing provided by host families. It is meant to give players recently graduated from college or with limited minor league experience a chance to stay in baseball shape, and give them an opportunity to be signed to contracts with MLB affiliated minor league teams. League revenue comes primarily from sponsorship partners and other advertisements, ticket sales and ballpark concessions. Current managers in the league include former Major League Baseball players Jim Essian, Paul Noce, and Von Joshua.

Forty-five players from the USPBL have signed contracts with Major League Baseball organizations. During the 2019 season, pitcher Randy Dobnak became the first alum to advance all the way to the Major Leagues when he was called up to the Minnesota Twins on August 8, 2019. A second USPBL alum, Logan Gillaspie, was called up to the Baltimore Orioles on May 17, 2022. A third USPBL player, Jared Koenig, made his MLB debut with the Oakland Athletics during the 2022 season.

Teams
 Birmingham-Bloomfield Beavers
 Eastside Diamond Hoppers
 Utica Unicorns
 Westside Woolly Mammoths

Champions

References

External links
 Official website

Independent baseball leagues in the United States
Baseball leagues in Michigan
Sports in Metro Detroit
Sports leagues established in 2016
2016 establishments in Michigan
Professional sports leagues in the United States